My Boyfriend's Back is a 1993 American zombie film directed by Bob Balaban which tells the story of Johnny Dingle (Andrew Lowery), a teenage boy who returns from the dead as a zombie to meet Missy McCloud (Traci Lind), the girl he's in love with, for a date. The film received negative reviews.

The film's title is a reference to the 1963 song of the same name by The Angels (which is used in the promotional trailers, but not featured in the film itself). The original title of the film, Johnny Zombie, was changed shortly before the film's theatrical release. Philip Seymour Hoffman, Matthew McConaughey, and Matthew Fox appear in small roles in the film.

Plot
Johnny Dingle has been in love with Missy McCloud since they were kids. In his senior year of high school, he decides to fake a robbery at Missy’s job with his best friend, Eddie. He hopes that by stopping the "robbery" he will impress her and she will go to the prom with him.

During the "robbery" a real robber holds Johnny and Missy at gunpoint. Thinking it is Eddie, Johnny dies taking a bullet meant for Missy. After the funeral, Johnny rises from the grave. He is greeted by Murray the gravedigger, who warns him that he can’t leave the cemetery. Johnny ignores him and goes back to his home.

Missy is hesitant to be around Johnny, but changes her mind when her boyfriend Buck and his dim-witted friend Chuck discriminate against him for being a Zombie. They go on a date, which goes well until Missy accidentally rips Johnny’s ear off.

Johnny goes to the town doctor, Dr. Bronson, who refers him to a woman named Maggie, the widow of a zombie.  She tells Johnny that he needs to eat the flesh of the living to stop decaying.

Johnny and Missy meet up at the library, where he’s attacked by Buck and Chuck. Chuck accidentally hits himself in the head with an ax and dies. Johnny eats Chuck's body, invoking the wrath of Chuck’s father, Big Chuck.

Missy’s father, the town sheriff, tells Johnny to leave town for his own safety. Johnny doesn’t listen and returns to Missy at night, but leaves when he bites her arm. He’s captured by Dr.Bronson, who attempts to dissect Johnny and create a youth formula from his zombie cells. Johnny escapes when Big Chuck leads a mob to kill him, with Missy and Eddie helping him. He flees to the cemetery, where Murray, his parents, Eddie, and Missy defend him, earning him the town and the sheriff’s acceptance. Johnny and Missy dance, but Johnny begins to decay and dies.

In Heaven, he’s told by the gatekeeper that he was not meant to die in the robbery, and he is sent back the moment before the robber entered. The events replay but Johnny survives this time due to the bullet hitting Missy’s locket. Johnny and Missy go to the prom as a couple.

Cast
 Andrew Lowery as Johnny Dingle
 Traci Lind as Missy McCloud
 Danny Zorn as Eddie
 Edward Herrmann as Mr. Dingle
 Mary Beth Hurt as Mrs. Dingle
 Jay O. Sanders as Sheriff McCloud
 Libby Villari as Camille McCloud
 Matthew Fox as Buck Van Patten
 Philip Hoffman as Chuck Bronski
 Paul Dooley as Big Chuck
 Austin Pendleton as Dr. Bronson
 Bob Dishy as Murray the Gravedigger 
 Cloris Leachman as Maggie the Zombie Expert
 Paxton Whitehead as Judge in Heaven
 Matthew McConaughey as Guy #2
 Renée Zellweger (scenes cut)

Production

Casting
This is the first film role for Matthew Fox and Matthew McConaughey. Renée Zellweger's only scene was cut from the film.

Reception

Critical reception
Rotten Tomatoes, a review aggregator, reports that 13% of 23 surveyed critics gave the film a positive review; the average rating was 3.4/10.  Variety called it "an idiotic offbeat comedy" that "repeats ideas and jokes more effectively used in his 1989 Parents."  Stephen Holden of The New York Times wrote, "If My Boyfriend's Back is an irredeemably silly movie, it has an engaging lightness of tone and uniformly impeccable performances by a cast that maintains just the right attitude of deadpan parody."  Kevin Thomas of the Los Angeles Times called it "an awful teen horror comedy".  Thomas wrote that "has a disastrous tone of sunny sitcom jauntiness" when it should have focused on dark satire.  Mark Caro of the Chicago Tribune wrote, "The movie is full of nonsensical plot twists, embarrassingly broad performances and unappealing characters."  Caro criticized the casting of Lowery, calling his character "perhaps the least interesting movie zombie ever".  Jeff Shannon of the Seattle Times wrote, "Simply put, absolutely none of it works. The movie utterly fails to set a foundation for its dark fantasy, effectively turning every character into a moron." Ty Burr of Entertainment Weekly rated it "D" and compared it negatively to Heathers.  Dendle called it the best of the zombie romantic comedy films of the late 1980s and early 1990s but criticized its use of family-friendly themes as "cheesy" and "saccharine".

Themes
Academic Peter Dendle identifies the themes of the film as being standard teen film tropes.  Dingle's urges to eat his date are a metaphor for teenage sexual activity, and his fear of decomposition is teenage anxiety over acne.  As a zombie, Dingle is discriminated against and ostracized, which is meant to show zombies as outsiders.

See also
 List of zombie films

References

External links

 
 
 

1990s black comedy films
1990s comedy horror films
1993 romantic comedy films
1990s teen comedy films
1990s teen fantasy films
1990s teen romance films
1990s romantic fantasy films
1993 films
1993 horror films
American black comedy films
American comedy horror films
American romantic comedy films
American romantic fantasy films
American teen comedy films
American teen romance films
American zombie comedy films
Touchstone Pictures films
Films scored by Harry Manfredini
Films directed by Bob Balaban
Films about proms
Resurrection in film
1990s English-language films
1990s American films